The Ann Arbor Railroad  was an American railroad that operated between Toledo, Ohio, and Elberta and Frankfort, Michigan (about 294 route miles) with train ferry operations across Lake Michigan. In 1967 it reported 572 million net ton-miles of revenue freight, including 107 million in "lake transfer service"; that total does not include the 39-mile subsidiary Manistique and Lake Superior Railroad.

History
The railroad company was chartered September 21, 1895, as successor to the Toledo, Ann Arbor and North Michigan Railway. In 1905, it was acquired by the Detroit, Toledo & Ironton Railway (DTI) and Eugene Zimmerman assumed presidency of both lines. DTI went bankrupt three years later. Zimmerman remained president until 1909 when he lost control of the line to Joseph Ramsey Jr. and Newman Erb. Ramsey assumed the presidency, serving until 1913 when Erb became president and ran the line for the next eleven years. Erb also served as president of the Minneapolis and St. Louis Railway 1912 to 1916. Wabash Railroad gained control of Ann Arbor Railroad in 1925.

The company ended its last passenger train, a once a day train in each direction train from the AA's Toledo station to its Elberta boat landing, on July 19, 1950. Major stops on the route besides the end points included Ann Arbor, Durand, Owosso, Mt. Pleasant and Cadillac. The passenger side was hampered by the limited number of noteworthy cities en route and the fact that all but the Durand Union Station were in cities in which trains for connecting points were at different stations from the AA station, thus necessitating use of surface transportation for transfer between train stations.

For many years the Ann Arbor was owned by the Wabash Railroad, but Wabash gave up control in 1963 as part of its absorption into the Norfolk and Western.  The DT&I, by then itself owned by the giant Pennsylvania Railroad, again gained control in 1963. The combined DT&I and AA were operated as independent subsidiaries of the PRR but suffered from the parent company's ill-fated 1968 merger with the New York Central. Upon the resulting Penn Central's 1970 bankruptcy, the DT&I and its Ann Arbor subsidiary were sold off to private investors.

The Ann Arbor Railroad owned a subsidiary, the Manistique and Lake Superior Railroad (M&LS), from somewhere shortly after that line's origin in 1909 until it was abandoned in 1968.

After itself going bankrupt in 1973 the Ann Arbor ceased operations as a railroad on April 1, 1976. The State of Michigan bought most of the line, subsidizing Conrail as a designated operator. The contract was transferred to the Michigan Interstate Railway on October 1, 1977.  Michigan Interstate operated the line as the "Ann Arbor Railroad System." In 1982, the state split the operating contract among Michigan Interstate from Toledo to Ann Arbor, Tuscola & Saginaw Bay Railway from Ann Arbor to Alma, and Michigan Northern Railway from Alma to Elberta. In 1984 the state ended Michigan Northern's contract and designated Tuscola & Saginaw Bay as the operator on that portion.

On October 7, 1988, a new Ann Arbor Railroad began operating the portion south of Ann Arbor; the Great Lakes Central Railroad now serves the remaining portions of the line. Some sections have been abandoned: from Yuma to Elberta and Frankfort (approximately 45 miles), about 10 miles in Shiawassee County, Michigan (in three discontinuous sections), and the trackage around the now-demolished Cherry Street Station in Toledo.

Train ferries
The Ann Arbor's Lake Michigan train ferry fleet at Elberta started in November 1892 when the Toledo, Ann Arbor and Northern Michigan Railway acquired its first two boats, Ann Arbor 1 and Ann Arbor 2. At its height, the AA served four ports on the west of Lake Michigan:
Kewaunee, Wisconsin, from 1892 connecting with Kewaunee, Green Bay and Western Railroad,
Menominee, Michigan, from 1894 connecting with Chicago, Milwaukee and St. Paul Railway, Chicago and North Western Railway, and Wisconsin and Michigan Railroad
Gladstone, Michigan in Michigan Upper Peninsula, from 1895 connecting with the Minneapolis, St. Paul and Sault Ste. Marie Railroad. Later moved to Manistique, Michigan, connecting with Duluth, South Shore and Atlantic Railway via AA subsidiary Manistique and Lake Superior Railroad
Manitowoc, Wisconsin, from 1896 connecting with Chicago and North Western Railway, and Wisconsin Central Railway

Fleet
Altogether, eight boats were built for service with the AA and one was leased from the Grand Trunk Milwaukee Car Ferry Company.
 – designed by Frank E. Kirby and built by Craig Ship Building, Toledo, Ohio, in 1892. Capacity 24 cars on four tracks.
 – designed by Frank E. Kirby and built by Craig Ship Building, Toledo, Ohio, in 1892. Capacity 24 cars on four tracks.
 – built by Globe Iron Works, Cleveland, Ohio, in 1898.
 – built by Globe Iron Works, Cleveland, Ohio, in 1906.
 – designed by Frank E. Kirby and built by Toledo Shipbuilding Company in 1910.
, a Grand Trunk Western vessel was leased in 1978.

See also

History of railroads in Michigan

References

Further reading

External links
Ann Arbor Railroad Technical and Historical Association

Former Class I railroads in the United States
Railway companies established in 1895
Railway companies disestablished in 1976
Central Michigan
Northern Michigan
Transportation in Toledo, Ohio
Defunct Michigan railroads
Defunct Ohio railroads
Predecessors of Conrail
Transportation in Ann Arbor, Michigan
Companies that filed for Chapter 11 bankruptcy in 1970
1905 mergers and acquisitions
1895 establishments in the United States